Monroe Leland Hayward (December 22, 1840December 5, 1899) was a politician from Nebraska. He was elected to become a Senator of Nebraska in 1899, dying before taking the oath of office.

Life and career
Hayward was born in Willsboro, New York. He served during the Civil War in the Twenty-second Regiment, New York Volunteer Infantry, and in the Fifth Regiment, New York Volunteer Cavalry. He graduated from Fort Edward Collegiate Institute, New York, in 1865. Hayward then studied law in Whitewater, Wisconsin; he was admitted to the bar in 1867 and commenced practice in Nebraska City, Nebraska. He was a member of the state constitutional convention in 1873.  He became judge of the district court of Nebraska in 1886.

Hayward was elected as a Republican to the United States Senate on March 8, 1899, to fill the vacancy in the term beginning March 4, 1899.  This delay was caused by the failure of the Nebraska Legislature to elect a Senator by the start of the term. He did not take the Senate's oath of office before his death and was hence never officially a Senator, both because his health deteriorated after his election, and the Senate had adjourned. He died in Nebraska City, Nebraska on December 5, 1899, while in a coma. He was interred in Wyuka Cemetery.

Sources at the time noted that while he was a Republican, the Governor appointing his replacement, William A. Poynter was a Populist. He was hence replaced by Populist William V. Allen. The Courier wrote: "Ethically as a republican senator was elected and has
died a republican should be appointed to take his place, but such transcendental politics is still unheard of in the year of our Lord eighteen hundred and ninety-nine."

His son, Colonel William Hayward, commanded the 369th Infantry Regiment during the First World War, known as the Harlem Hellfighters.

His grandson was Broadway producer Leland Hayward, and the writer Brooke Hayward is his great-granddaughter.

See also
List of United States Congress members who died in office (1790–1899)

References

U.S. Congress. Memorial Addresses for Monroe L. Hayward. 56th Cong., 1st sess., 1900. Washington: Government Printing Office, 1900.
 Retrieved on 2008-11-05

External links
 

|-

1840 births
1899 deaths
19th-century American judges
19th-century American lawyers
19th-century American politicians
American people of English descent
Elected officials who died without taking their seats
Nebraska lawyers
Nebraska Republicans
Nebraska state court judges
People from Nebraska City, Nebraska
People from Whitewater, Wisconsin
People from Willsboro, New York
People of New York (state) in the American Civil War
Republican Party United States senators from Nebraska
Union Army soldiers